The 1992–93 Liga Alef season saw Hapoel Beit She'an (champions of the North Division) and Hapoel Rishon LeZion (champions of the South Division) win their regional divisions and promotion to Liga Artzit, along with runners-up Hapoel Tayibe and Hapoel Bat Yam.

At the bottom, Maccabi Bnei Hatzor (from the North division) and Beitar Netanya (from the South division) finished bottom and relegated to Liga Bet.

North Division

South Division

References
Alef and Bet Leagues, 1986-87 – 1993-94 Eran R, Israblog  (archived 11 August 2018)

Liga Alef seasons
Israel
3